Seymour Dilworth Young (September 7, 1897 – July 9, 1981) was a general authority of the Church of Jesus Christ of Latter-day Saints (LDS Church) from 1945 until his death.

From 1945 to 1975, Young was a member of the church's First Council of the Seventy. In 1975, he was sustained a member of the newly created First Quorum of Seventy. He was the senior president of the Seventy from 1967 to 1976.

Young was a graduate of Weber College (now Weber State University).  He served in the United States military during World War I.  After the war he served as a missionary in the Central States Mission.

Young was known as an author and poet among members of the church. Young authored a biography of his great-great-uncle, LDS Church president Brigham Young. Many of Dilworth Young's poems have been published in the Ensign. He was born to Seymour B. Young, Jr. and Carlie Louine Clawson. Young was the grandson of Latter-day Saint leader Seymour B. Young, the nephew of Levi E. Young and the great-grandson of Joseph Young. He was also a descendant of Edward Partridge. One of Young's early American ancestors, Thomas Bascom, a founder of Windsor, Connecticut, was of French Basque and French Huguenot descent. Young married Gladys Pratt and had two children, one of whom died in World War II. Following his first wife's death, Young married Huldah Parker.

From 1947 to 1951, Young was president of the church's New England Mission.

Young is the subject of a biography by his grandson, Benson Y. Parkinson (Covenant, 1994).

References

External links
Grampa Bill's G.A. Pages: S. Dilworth Young
Leon R. Hartshorn. Outstanding Stories by General Authorities. (Salt Lake City: Deseret Book Company, 1970) Vol. 1, p. 225.
 S. Dilworth Young letter. MSS SC 448; S. Dilworth Young letter; 20th Century Western and Mormon Manuscripts; L. Tom Perry Special Collections, Harold B. Lee Library, Brigham Young University.

1897 births
1981 deaths
20th-century Mormon missionaries
American Latter Day Saint writers
American Mormon missionaries in the United States
American general authorities (LDS Church)
Latter Day Saints from Utah
Members of the First Quorum of the Seventy (LDS Church)
Mission presidents (LDS Church)
Presidents of the Seventy (LDS Church)
Richards–Young family
Weber State University alumni